Hakea actites, commonly known as the mulloway needle bush or wallum hakea is a shrub or tree of the Proteacea family native to areas in north eastern New South Wales and south eastern Queensland. White nectar rich flowers appear in abundance from late autumn to early spring.

Description
Smaller branches are silky to densely covered with short matted hairs. The inflorescence consists of 1-6 white flowers appearing in clusters in leaf axils. Occasionally fruits appear with coarse blister like protuberances. Flowers from May to September.
Hakea actites resembles the better known Hakea sericea.

Taxonomy and naming
Hakea actites was first formally described by botanist William Barker in 1996 and the description was  published in the Journal of the Adelaide Botanic Garden. The type specimen was collected from near Angourie on the North Coast of New South Wales.
The specific epithet is derived from the Ancient Greek word (aktites) meaning "shore dweller" referring to the coastal regions where the species is found.
Mulloway needle bush is part of the Sericea group, a mostly eastern states group with simple terete leaves, inflorescences containing few flowers, hairy pedicels and single woody fruits. Other members of the group include Hakea constablei, Hakea decurrens, Hakea gibbosa, Hakea lissosperma, Hakea macraeana, Hakea sericea and Hakea tephrosperma among others.

Distribution and habitat
Hakea actites is found in swampy locations in coastal areas from around Hervey Bay in south-eastern Queensland in the north to a little north of Coffs Harbour in New South Wales in the south.
It grows well in damp sand to sandy clay soils and is often part of open wallum heathland and Eucalyptus forest communities.

Uses in horticulture
A very hardy species that may be grown from seed and suited to coastal swampy situations. Provides protection, nesting sites and nectar for small birds due to its prickly habit and profuse flowering.

References

actites
Flora of New South Wales
Flora of Queensland
Plants described in 1996
Taxa named by William Robert Barker